DHW may stand for:
Desperate Housewives
Dhanwar Rai language
Domestic hot water (plumbing)
DHW Fototechnik, a successor to the German Franke & Heidecke company manufacturing the Rolleiflex medium format cameras and slide projectors between 2009 and 2015